Stuart Maconie (born 13 August 1961) is an English radio DJ and television presenter, writer, journalist, and critic working in the field of pop music and popular culture. He is currently a presenter on BBC Radio 6 Music where, alongside Mark Radcliffe, he hosts its weekend breakfast show (SaturdaySunday, 8am10am) which broadcasts from the BBC's MediaCityUK in Salford. The pair had previously presented an evening show on BBC Radio 2 and the weekday afternoon show for BBC Radio 6 Music.

Maconie used to present his own solo show on Saturday afternoons from April 2006 until 29 March 2008, and is a frequent stand-in for holidaying presenters on Radio 2. He also hosts BBC Radio 6 Music programmes The Freak Zone, on Sundays from 8pm to 10pm and Freak Zone Playlist (formerly known as The Freakier Zone) on Wednesday night/Thursday mornings from midnight to 1am.

Early life
Maconie was born in Whiston. He was raised in Prescot, Merseyside. He was educated at  St John Rigby College, Orrell and Edge Hill University, Ormskirk.

While at St John Rigby College, Maconie formed a band named (after several iterations) Les Flirts, featuring Maconie on guitar/vocals, Nigel Power on bass and Jem Bretherton on drums.

Career
In his career as a writer and journalist he has written for Q, Word Magazine, ELLE, The Times, The Guardian, the Evening Standard, Daily Express, Select, Mojo, Country Walking, Deluxe and was an assistant editor for the NME. In September 2008, he began a new monthly column for Cumbria Life magazine. Maconie previously worked as an English and sociology teacher at Skelmersdale College, Lancashire for one year in 1987–88. He has written screenplays for television and films.

Maconie is also the author of Cider With Roadies, an autobiography of his experiences as a music journalist that references Cider with Rosie in the wordplay of the title. Pies and Prejudice: In Search of the North, a book that discusses the modern reality of Northern England (as opposed to the popular myths), was published in February 2007, with an audio version following in March 2009. Maconie, portraying himself a 'professional northerner', uses childhood experiences alongside anecdotes from recent visits to illuminate the book. A third book, Adventures on the High Teas: In Search of Middle England was published in March 2009. Maconie's March 2012 book, Never Mind the Quantocks, is a collection of more than 50 essays from his monthly column in Country Walking magazine.

Maconie also claimed to have started two urban legends; that Bob Holness, UK host of the game show Blockbusters, played the sax solo on Gerry Rafferty's hit single "Baker Street" and that David Bowie invented the board game Connect Four. The stories first appeared as blatant jokes in a spoof NMEs Believe It or Not feature, but have since been repeated elsewhere as if true. He also claimed to have been the first to use the term Britpop for the British pop music movement of the mid 1990s. "I'm sure someone must have used the expression before me about the Hollies, or the Beatles, back in the '60s. But I was the first person to use it about bands like Oasis and Blur".

In February 2023, Roger Waters of Pink Floyd was highly critical of Maconie for an article in the New Statesman which he said misrepresented his views on bandmate David Gilmour's musicianship. Waters said, "It's the usual, shit stirring, ill informed nonsense." He accused Maconie of "unearned condescending authority" and said "I don't know who he thinks he's quoting when he says Gilmour's 'horrible guitar solos' but it sure as shit ain't me." He concluded, "So, Stuart Maconie, you little prick, next time, please check your copy with the subjects of your grubby little piece, before you go to print."

Publications 
His books include:
 3862 Days: The Official History of Blur
 James – Folklore: The Official History
 Cider with Roadies
 Pies and Prejudice: In Search of the North
 Adventures on the High Teas: In Search of Middle England
 Short Stories for Short Breaks
 Never Mind the Quantocks
 The Pie at Night: In Search of the North at Play
 Long Road from Jarrow: A journey through Britain then and now
 The Nanny State Made Me: A Story of Britain and How to Save it

Broadcasting 
As a broadcaster, his work has appeared on television and radio.

Radio 1 
He was a music reporter for Mark Goodier's Evening Session on BBC Radio 1, alongside Andrew Collins. Also on Radio 1, from 1995 to 1997, Maconie joined forces with Collins presenting a music review called Collins and Maconie's Hit Parade, which originally went out on Monday nights from 9pm to 10pm and then on Sunday afternoons from 3pm to 4pm. In addition to this, in October 1996, Maconie took over a weekly album show on Radio 1 on Sunday nights, until late 1997.

Radio 2 
Maconie joined BBC Radio 2 in 1998, with shows such as All Singing, All Dancing, All Night, a northern soul music show, and, for several years, Stuart Maconie's Critical List on Saturday evenings. He also presents documentaries and deputised for Johnnie Walker on Radio 2's Drivetime programme.

From April 2006 to 29 March 2008, Maconie presented the Saturday afternoon show previously presented by Chris Evans.

In addition to his Saturday show, on 16 April 2007, Maconie joined forces with Mark Radcliffe to present a new show on BBC Radio 2 which was broadcast between Monday and Wednesday (Monday to Thursday up to April 2010) from 8pm to 10pm. As of spring 2011 this show was transferred to 6 Music in the afternoon slot, 14pm weekdays.
In 2012 Maconie began presenting The People's Songs, a "story of modern Britain in 50 records". Described as music as social history, 50 programmes in the series examine periods in Britain, the events that were occurring and how a particular song was the soundtrack of that period.

Radio 5 Live
From 1994 to 2001, he presented the satirical news review The Treatment, on BBC Radio 5 Live.

BBC Radio 6 Music 
He also joined BBC Radio 6 Music from its inception in 2002 where he presents The Freak Zone radio show. It is described as "the weird, the wonderful and all that's in between", and is very diverse in musical content. This show is broadcast every Sunday from 8pm to 10pm, and has been supplemented in 2010 with The Freakier Zone, which airs from midnight to 1am every Saturday night/Sunday morning. As of spring 2011 his Radio 2 show with Mark Radcliffe was moved to 6 Music, weekdays 14pm. The afternoon show ended on 21 December 2018 and moved to the weekend breakfast show in January 2019.

Other broadcasting 
Maconie has also presented musical specialities for BBC Radio 4 and the new-style "populist" BBC Radio 3 and has appeared on television and in films. In 2007 he presented Stuart Maconie's TV Towns for ITV3, six one-hour shows about TV and film locations in Newcastle, Birmingham, Manchester, Edinburgh, Liverpool and London.

In February 2015 he was the guest of Sarah Walker on BBC Radio 3's Essential Classics. Since 2016 he has appeared on the North of England team on the BBC Radio 4's Round Britain Quiz.

Other projects 
Maconie is President of The Ramblers and is a keen fellwalker. He completed, on 20 June 2009, all 214 Wainwrights in Cumbria and is an honorary member of the Wainwright Society, having given their Memorial Lecture in 2006. In late 2009, Experience Northwest released a series of short stories he wrote about the hidden gems in England's Northwest.

Personal life 
Maconie is a supporter of Wigan Athletic F.C. and Wigan Warriors. In December 2009, Maconie was awarded an honorary master's degree by Edge Hill University, Ormskirk. The university has a hall of residence called Maconie in his honour.

In July 2011, he was awarded an honorary Doctor of Letters (DLitt) from the University of Bolton.

In January 2016 he became a patron of Warley Woods after a number of years being actively involved.

Politics 
Maconie is politically left of centre and joined the Labour Party at the age of 17. He has commented on Marxism: "In these days of identity politics and what you might call 'the selfie-fication' of political thought, Marxism remains refreshingly bracing in its view of the world."

References

External links

Radcliffe and Maconie (BBC Radio 6 Music)
Freak Zone Playlist (BBC Radio 6 Music)
Stuart Maconie's Freak Zone (BBC Radio 6 Music)

1961 births
Living people
Alumni of Edge Hill University
Alumni of the University of Bolton
BBC Radio 2 presenters
BBC Radio 6 Music presenters
English male journalists
English male non-fiction writers
English Marxists
English music critics
English non-fiction writers
English people of Scottish descent
English radio DJs
English radio presenters
English television presenters
NME writers
People associated with Edge Hill University
People from Wigan
The Times people
Walkers of the United Kingdom